Shooting sports at the 1978 Asian Games was held in Huamark Sports Complex Shooting Range, Bangkok, Thailand from 11 December 1978 to 16 December 1978.

Shooting comprised eleven individual and eleven team events, all open to both men and women. Each team could enter four shooters per event but only one score from each country counts in the individual competitions.

Medalists

Medal table

References 

 ISSF Results Overview

External links
Asian Shooting Federation

 
1978 Asian Games events
1978
Asian Games
1978 Asian Games